Tele-audiology is the utilization of telemedicine to provide audiological services and may include the full scope of audiological practice.

This term was first used by Dr. Gregg Givens in 1999 in reference to a system being developed at East Carolina University in North Carolina, USA. The first Internet audiological test was accomplished in 2000 by Givens, Balch and Keller.

The first Transatlantic teleaudiology test was performed in April 2009 when Dr James Hall tested a patient in South Africa from Dallas at the AAA conference. Since that historic event the interest in tele-audiology increased significantly.

There are 2 types of teleaudiology tests:

Store-and-forward (Asynchronous) tests
Testing a patient and then transferring the results via emailing or the Internet to a professional that will look at the results

Real-time (Synchronous) tests
Testing a patient in real-time as if the patient is sitting in front of you. Audiologists are used to testing patients remotely because testing a patient in a sound booth while the audiologist sits outside the booth is virtually the same as testing a patient over the Internet. The window is not a real glass window but a teleconference window. The only real difference is that the physical distance changed.

References 

Crowell, E., Givens, G., Jones, G., Brechtelsbauer, P., and Yao, J.  (2011) Audiology Telepractice in a Clinical Environment: A Communication Perspective, Journal of Otology, Rhinology and Laryngology.
Yao, J. and Givens, G. (2010) Using Web Services to Realize Remote Hearing Assessment, Journal of Clinical Monitoring and Computing, 24,41-50.
Yao, J., Wan, Y. and Givens, G., (2009) Design of a Web Services Based System for Remote Hearing Diagnosis, Proceedings of the 31st Annual International Conference of the IEEE Engineering in Medicine and Biology Society.
Yao. J., Givens, G. and Wan, Y., (2009) Web Services-based Distributed System with Browser-Client Architecture to Promote Tele-audiology Assessment, Journal of Telemedicine and E-Health, Vol. 15,8 758-763, .
Givens, G. (2005). Editor, Audiology Telepractice, Seminars in Hearing, 26 (1).
Georgeadis, A., Givens, G., Krumm, M., Mashimina, P., Torrens, J., and Brown, J. (2004) Audiologists providing clinical services via Telepractice [Technical Report]. American Speech-Language-Hearing Association. 
Georgeadis, A., Givens, G., Krumm, M., Mashimina, P., Torrens, J., and Brown, J. (2004) Speech-language pathologists providing clinical services via Telepractice [Technical Report]. American Speech-Language-Hearing Association. 
Givens, G. & Elangovan, S. (2003). Internet Application to Tele-audiology- "Nothin but Net". American Journal of Audiology, 12 (2), 59-65.
Givens, G., Blanarovich, A., Murphy, T., Simmons, S., Balch, D., & Elangovan, S. (2003). Internet-based tele-audiometry System for the Assessment of Hearing: A Pilot Study. Telemedicine Journal and e-Health, 9 (4),

Telemedicine
Audiology